The karomo (Oreochromis karomo) is a species of cichlid endemic to Tanzania, where it is found in the Malagarasi River basin. It is also considered an excellent food fish and is sought-after by commercial fisheries as well as being farmed.

References

karomo
Endemic freshwater fish of Tanzania
Fish described in 1948
Taxonomy articles created by Polbot